Trevardo V. Williams (born December 31, 1990) is a Jamaican-born former American football defensive end. He played college football at Connecticut, and was drafted by the Houston Texans in the fourth round of the 2013 NFL Draft. Williams has also been a member of the Arizona Cardinals, Indianapolis Colts, Washington Redskins, Toronto Argonauts.

Early years
Williams was born in Jamaica, and moved to the United States as a child in 1999. He attended Central High School in Bridgeport, Connecticut, where he played high school football for the Central Hilltoppers.  The Hartford Courant and New Haven Register named him to their all-state football teams in 2007. Upon graduation, Williams attended boarding school Canterbury School in New Milford, Connecticut and competed for the Saints.

Williams was also a standout athlete for the Central High School track team. He finished 3rd in the 100 meters at the 2007 State Open championships with a time of 10.74 seconds. He finished 2nd in the 200 meters at the 2008 State Class LL Championships, with a time of 22.41 seconds. He was timed at a career-best time of 10.69 seconds in the 100 meters in his senior year. He also ran a personal best time of 21.98 in the 200 meters.

College career
Williams attended the University of Connecticut, where he played for the Connecticut Huskies football team from 2009 to 2012. During his college career, he started 30 of 50 games in which he appeared, recording 133 tackles and 30.5 quarterback sacks. The 30.5 sacks are a team record.  Following his senior season in 2012, he was a unanimous first-team All-Big East Conference selection.

Professional career

Houston Texans
The Houston Texans selected Williams in the fourth round, with the 124th overall pick, of the 2013 NFL Draft. He was released by the Texans on August 1, 2014

Arizona Cardinals
Williams was claimed off waivers by the Arizona Cardinals on August 2, 2014, but was released on August 8.

Indianapolis Colts
Williams signed with the Indianapolis Colts' practice squad on September 23, 2014. He was released on November 25.

Washington Redskins
Williams signed with the Washington Redskins practice squad on December 2, 2014. He was promoted to the active roster on December 9. He was waived/injured on August 14, 2015. After going unclaimed, the Redskins placed him on injured reserve. The Redskins released Williams from injured reserve with a settlement on August 19.

References

External links
Washington Redskins bio
Indianapolis Colts bio
UConn Huskies bio

1990 births
Living people
American football defensive ends
American football linebackers
Canadian football defensive linemen
African-American players of American football
African-American players of Canadian football
American people of Jamaican descent
Canterbury School (Connecticut) alumni
UConn Huskies football players
Houston Texans players
Arizona Cardinals players
Indianapolis Colts players
Washington Redskins players
Toronto Argonauts players
Jamaican players of American football
Players of American football from Connecticut
Sportspeople from Bridgeport, Connecticut
Central High School (Connecticut) alumni
21st-century African-American sportspeople